WTJY (89.5 FM) is a radio station broadcasting a Southern Gospel format. Licensed to Asheboro, North Carolina, United States.  The station is currently owned by Positive Alternative Radio, Inc. and features programming from Salem Communications.

References

External links

Southern Gospel radio stations in the United States
Radio stations established in 1999
1999 establishments in North Carolina
TJY